The Bishop of Moray, Ross and Caithness is the ordinary of the Scottish Episcopal Diocese of Moray, Ross and Caithness.

The bishop's seat (cathedra) is located at the Cathedral Church of St Andrew, Inverness, Scotland. The current bishop is the Right Reverend Mark Strange who was elected on 2 June 2007 and consecrated and installed on 13 October 2007.

Past and present bishops

Notes

References

External links
 The Diocese of Moray, Ross and Caithness 

 Inverness
Diocese of Moray, Ross and Caithness